Arenivaga tonkawa, the tonkawa sand cockroach, is a species of cockroach in the family Corydiidae. It is found in Central America and North America.

References

Cockroaches
Articles created by Qbugbot
Insects described in 1920